Georges Parent (December 15, 1879 – December 14, 1942) was a Canadian lawyer, politician and Speaker of the Senate of Canada from 1940 until 1942.

Parent was born in Quebec City, the son of Simon-Napoléon Parent who served as Premier of Quebec from 1900 to 1905 and Mayor of Quebec City from 1894 until 1905.

He studied law at Université Laval and was admitted to the Bar of Quebec in 1904 and joined the law firm of Fitzpatrick, Parent, Taschereau, Roy and Cannon in Quebec City.

That same year, at the age of 25, Parent was first elected to the House of Commons of Canada in the 1904 federal election as the Liberal Member of Parliament for Montmorency, Quebec. As the youngest Member of Parliament and was asked by Prime Minister Wilfrid Laurier to second the motion on the Speech from the Throne. He was re-elected in 1908 but defeated in the 1911.

Out of office, Parent returned to his legal practice and pursued various business interests. He ultimately became president of Citadel Brick Ltd., Equitable Enterprises and of Wolfesfield Ltd., Vice-President of Donnacona Paper Company and was a director of several other firms including the publisher of Le Soleil newspaper.

Parent returned to Parliament in the 1917 federal election as a Laurier-Liberal representing Quebec West. He remained an MP until June 3, 1930, when he was appointed to the Senate of Canada by Prime Minister William Lyon Mackenzie King prior to the 1930 federal election.

In 1940, King named him Speaker of the Senate on May 9, 1940. Parent died in office on December 14, 1942.

Electoral record

References

1879 births
1942 deaths
Canadian senators from Quebec
Laurier Liberals
Liberal Party of Canada MPs
Liberal Party of Canada senators
Members of the House of Commons of Canada from Quebec
Lawyers in Quebec
Speakers of the Senate of Canada
Université Laval alumni